Mike Sottile (born June 7, 1948) is an American politician. He is a former member of the South Carolina House of Representatives from the 112th District, serving from 2009 to 2020, and a former mayor of the Isle of Palms. He is a member of the Republican party.

References

Living people
1948 births
Republican Party members of the South Carolina House of Representatives
21st-century American politicians